Dyspessacossus fereidun is a species of moth of the family Cossidae. It is found in Turkey, Azerbaijan, Armenia, Iraq, Iran, Syria and Israel.

Adults have been recorded on wing in August in Israel.

Subspecies
Dyspessacossus fereidun fereidun (Armenia, Iraq)
Dyspessacossus fereidun ahmadi Wiltshire, 1957 (Iraq)
Dyspessacossus fereidun osthelderi (Daniel, 1932) (Israel)

References

Moths described in 1895
Cossinae
Moths of Europe
Moths of Asia